The Association of Serbian Youth ( / Družina mladeži srpske) was the first student organisation in Serbia, founded in 1847 by the students of the Lyceum of the Principality of Serbia. 

Among the founders were Jevrem Grujić and Petar Protić Sokoljanin. 

This organisation was banned and disestablished in 1851 because of their criticism of the Defenders of the Constitution.

See also
Liberal Party (Kingdom of Serbia)

References 

Defunct organizations based in Serbia
19th century in Serbia
1847 establishments in Serbia
Organizations established in 1847
1851 disestablishments
Political history of Serbia
Principality of Serbia
Student organizations in Serbia